Quillaja is a genus of flowering plants, the only extant genus in the family Quillajaceae with two or three known species. It was once thought to be in the rose family, Rosaceae, but recent research shows it belongs in its own family. The inner bark of the soap bark tree (Q. saponaria) contains saponin, which is a natural soap.

Species
The species were revised by Luebert in 2014:

References

 
Fabales genera